The canton of Carentan-les-Marais (before March 2020: canton of Carentan) is an administrative division of the Manche department. Its borders were modified at the French canton reorganisation which came into effect in March 2015. Its seat is in Carentan-les-Marais.

Composition 

Appeville
Audouville-la-Hubert
Auvers
Baupte
Beuzeville-la-Bastille
Blosville
Boutteville
Carentan-les-Marais (partly)
Hiesville
Liesville-sur-Douve
Méautis
Neuville-au-Plain
Picauville
Saint-André-de-Bohon
Sainte-Marie-du-Mont
Sainte-Mère-Église
Saint-Germain-de-Varreville
Saint-Martin-de-Varreville
Sébeville
Terre-et-Marais
Turqueville

Councillors

Pictures of the canton

References 

Cantons of Manche